William McLaren (born in Fauldhouse, Scotland) was a professional footballer who played for Cowdenbeath, Burnley and Huddersfield Town.

References

Year of death missing
Scottish footballers
Footballers from West Lothian
Association football wing halves
Duntocher Hibernian F.C. players
Cowdenbeath F.C. players
Burnley F.C. players
Huddersfield Town A.F.C. players
Scottish Junior Football Association players
Scottish Football League players
English Football League players
1887 births
People from Fauldhouse